List of Guggenheim fellowship winners for 1978.

United States and Canada fellows 

Alice Adams, Deceased. Fiction: 1978.
JoAnne Akalaitis, Director, New York Shakespeare Festival: 1978.
Jervis B. Anderson, Writer; Staff Writer, The New Yorker, New York City: 1978.
Stuart S. Antman, Professor of Mathematics, University of Maryland at College Park: 1978.
Theodore Antoniou, Composer; Professor of Music, Boston University: 1978.
Ruth apRoberts, Professor Emeritus of English, University of California, Riverside: 1978.
Ralph Arlyck, Film Maker, Poughkeepsie, New York: 1978.
Eugene C. Ashby, Regents' Professor Emeritus of Chemistry, Georgia Institute of Technology: 1978.
Gordon Ashby, Designer, Inverness, California: 1978.
Maurice Auslander, Deceased. Mathematics: 1978.
Houston A. Baker, Jr., Albert M. Greenfield Professor of Human Relations, University of Pennsylvania: 1978.
Keith Michael Baker, J.E. Wallace Sterling Professor in the Humanities and Professor of History, Stanford University: 1978.
E. Digby Baltzell, Deceased. Sociology: 1978.
James Robert Bamburg, Professor of Biochemistry, Colorado State University: 1978.
Jonathan Baumbach, Writer; Professor of English, Brooklyn College, City University of New York: 1978.
Zdeněk Pavel Bažant, McCormick School Professor and Walter P. Murphy Professor of Civil Engineering and Materials Science, Northwestern University: 1978.
Howard S. Becker, Professor of Sociology, University of California, Santa Barbara: 1978.
Charles A. Bennett, Artist, New York City: 1978.
Richard M. A. Benson, Dean, Yale School of Art: 1978, 1986.
Robert F. Berkhofer, Professor of History, Oakes College, University of California, Santa Cruz: 1978.
Walter F. Berns, Resident Scholar, American Enterprise Institute, Washington: 1978.
Steven J. Beyer, Artist; Assistant Professor of Sculpture, Tyler School of Art, Temple University: 1978.
Edgar M. Branch, Research Professor Emeritus of English and Associate in American Literature, Miami University: 1978.
Patrick M. Brantlinger, Professor of English, Indiana University: 1978.
John I. Brauman, J.G. Jackson - C. J. Wood Professor of Chemistry, Stanford University: 1978.
Robert Breer, Film Maker; Professor of Art, Cooper Union for the Advancement of Science and Art: 1978.
Christopher Edward Brion, Professor of Chemistry, University of British Columbia: 1978.
A. Peter Brown, Professor of Musicology, Indiana University: 1978.
Vincent J. Bruno, Ashbel Smith Chair, Emeritus Professor of Art History, University of Texas at Arlington: 1978.
Elizabeth W. Bruss, Deceased. Literary Criticism: 1978.
Donald F. Buchla, Instrument Designer and Scholar, Berkeley, California: 1978.
Chris Burden, Artist; Professor, Head New Genre, University of California, Los Angeles: 1978.
William Michael Burke, Photographer; Instructor, School of the Museum of Fine Arts, Boston: 1978.
David S. Cannell, Professor of Physics, University of California, Santa Barbara: 1978.
E. A. Carmean, Art Historian and Curator, San Mateo, California: 1978.
Raymond Carver, Deceased. Fiction: 1978.
Phillip R. Certain, Professor of Chemistry, University of Wisconsin–Madison: 1978.
Leo M. Chalupa, chair, Professor of Neurobiology, Psychology & Behavior, University of California, Davis: 1978.
Nicolai Cikovsky, Jr., Senior Curator of American and British Painting, National Gallery of Art, Washington, D.C.: 1978.
Thurston Clarke, Writer, Willsboro, New York: 1978.
Thomas Clayton, Professor of English and of Classical Studies, University of Minnesota: 1978.
Martin Leonard Cody, Professor of Biology, University of California, Los Angeles: 1978.
Calvert Coggeshall, Deceased. Fine Arts: 1978.
Carolyn Cohen, chair, Graduate Biophysics Program; Professor of Biology, Brandeis University: 1978.
Marvin L. Cohen, University Professor of Physics, University of California, Berkeley: 1978, 1990.
Robert A. Colby, Professor Emeritus of Library Science, Queens College, City University of New York: 1978.
Stephen Cole, Leading Professor of Sociology, State University of New York at Stony Brook: 1978.
Alicia Colombí de Monguió, Professor of Spanish, SUNY at Albany, New York: 1978. Appointed As Alicia Colombí de Ferraresi.
Jaime H. Concha, Professor of Spanish and Latin American Literature, University of California, San Diego: 1978.
Jonathan Cott, Writer, New York City: 1978.
Donald M. Crothers, Alfred E. Kemp Professor of Chemistry and Molecular Biophysics and Biochemistry, Yale University: 1978.
Curtis Curtis-Smith, Composer; Professor of Music, Western Michigan University: 1978.
James Maurice Daniels, Professor Emeritus of Physics, University of Toronto: 1978.
Judy Dater, Artist/Photographer, Berkeley, California: 1978.
Alan M. Dershowitz, Felix Frankfurter Professor of Law, Harvard Law School: 1978.
Jan de Vries, Professor of History, University of California, Berkeley: 1978.
Tom DeWitt, Artist, Ancramdale, New York: 1978.
George T. Dickie, Professor Emeritus of Philosophy, University of Illinois at Chicago Circle: 1978.
Margaret Anne Doody, John and Barbara Glynn Family Professor of Literature, University of Notre Dame: 1978.
Henri Dorra, Professor of Art History, University of California, Santa Barbara: 1978.
John E. Dowling, Maria Moors Cabot Professor of Natural Sciences and Professor of Neuroscience, Harvard University: 1978.
Senta Driver, Choreographer; Artist Director, Harry's Foundation, Inc., New York City: 1978.
Robert C. Dunbar, Professor of Chemistry, Case Western Reserve University: 1978.
Martin Dworkin, Professor of Microbiology, University of Minnesota: 1978.
Donald M. Engelman, chair, Professor of Molecular Biophysics and Biochemistry, Yale University: 1978.
Clayton Eshleman, Poet, Ypsilanti, Michigan: 1978.
Claire Falkenstein, Artist, Venice, California: 1978.
Thomas D. Farber, Writer; Senior Lecturer, University of California, Berkeley: 1978.
Don W. Fawcett, Hersey Professor of Anatomy and Cell Biology, Harvard Medical School: 1978.
Andrew Fetler, Writer; Professor of English, University of Massachusetts Amherst: 1978.
Kit Fine, Professor of Philosophy, New York University: 1978.
Claude S. Fischer, Professor of Sociology, University of California, Berkeley: 1978.
Steven Fischler, Film Maker; Producer and Director, Pacific St. Film Projects, Inc., Brooklyn, New York: 1978.
Dagfinn Follesdal, Clarence Irving Lewis Professor of Philosophy, Stanford University; Professor of Philosophy, University of Oslo: 1978.
Michael Foran, Artist, Laramie, Wyoming: 1978.
Carolyn Forché, Poet; Professor of English, George Mason University: 1978.
Irving B. Fritz, Deceased. Biochemistry-Molecular Biology: 1978.
Tess Gallagher, Poet, Port Angeles, WA: 1978.
William A. Gamson, Professor of Sociology, Boston College: 1978.
Barbara Garson, Writer, New York City: 1978.
Jean Gaudon, Adviser in French Literature, Yale University: 1978.
John Gerassi, Writer; Professor of Political Science, Queens College, City University of New York: 1978.
David B. Geselowitz, Emeritus Professor of Bioengineering, Pennsylvania State University: 1978.
Michael T. Ghiselin, Senior Research Fellow, California Academy of Sciences, San Francisco: 1978.
Aharon Gibor, Emeritus Professor of Biology, University of California, Santa Barbara: 1978.
Walter S. Gibson, Andrew W. Mellon Professor Emeritus of the Humanities, Case Western Reserve University: 1978.
Frank Gillette, Video Artist, New York City: 1978.
George Glauberman, Professor of Mathematics, University of Chicago: 1978.
Paul F. Grendler, Emeritus Professor of History, University of Toronto: 1978.
Jan Groover, Photographer, Montpon-Menesterol, France: 1978.
Joan Delaney Grossman, Emeritus Professor of Slavic Languages and Literatures, University of California, Berkeley: 1978.
Henry Guerlac, Deceased: History of Science: 1978.
Edwin J. Gunn, Artist, New York City: 1978.
Robert W. Gutman, Dean, Art and Design Division, Fashion Institute of Technology, State University of New York: 1978.
Marshall M. Haith, Professor of Psychology, University of Denver: 1978.
John Halperin, Centennial Professor of English, Vanderbilt University: 1978,1985.
Gilbert H. Harman, Stuart Professor of Philosophy, Princeton University: 1978.
Daniel A. Harris, Associate Professor of English, Douglass College, Rutgers University: 1978.
William Hauptman, Playwright, New York City: 1978.
John Edward Hay, Director of Environmental Science, University of Auckland, New Zealand: 1978.
James J. Heckman, Henry Schultz Distinguished Service Professor of Economics, University of Chicago: 1978.
Roger A. Hegstrom, Professor of Chemistry, Wake Forest University: 1978.
John C. Heiss, Composer; Member of the Faculty, New England Conservatory of Music: 1978.
Jurgen Herbst, Emeritus Professor of Educational Policy Studies and of History, University of Wisconsin–Madison: 1978.
Darleane C. Hoffman, Professor of Chemistry, University of California, Berkeley; Senior Scientist, Lawrence Berkeley Laboratory: 1978.
Roald Hoffmann, Frank M. T. Rhodes Professor of Humane Letters, Cornell University: 1978.
Nancy L. Holt, Artist, New York City: 1978.
Bette Howland, Writer, Albuquerque, New Mexico: 1978.
Joseph A. Hudson, Composer, New York City: 1978.
Vernon W. Hughes, Sterling Professor Emeritus of Physics, Yale University: 1978.
Norris C. Hundley, Professor of History, University of California, Los Angeles: 1978.
George K. Hunter, Emily Sanford Professor Emeritus of English, Yale University: 1978.
James T. Hynes, Professor of Chemistry & Biochemistry, University of Colorado at Boulder: 1978.
Charles Israels, Composer: 1978.
Neil Jenney, Jr, Artist, New York City: 1978.
Robert Jervis, Adlai E. Stevenson Professor of International Affairs, Columbia University: 1978.
Joseph Katz, Deceased. Education: 1978.
William M. Kaula, Deceased. Earth Science: 1978.
David Kechley, Professor of Music, Williams College: 1978.
John L. Keep, Retired Professor of History, University of Toronto: 1978.
David N. Keightley, Emeritus Professor of History, University of California, Berkeley: 1978.
Charles M. H. Keil, Emeritus Professor of American Studies, State University of New York at Buffalo: 1978.
Andrew S. Kende, Charles F. Houghton Professor of Chemistry, University of Rochester: 1978.
Susan Estabrook Kennedy, chair, Professor of History, Virginia Commonwealth University: 1978.
Richard Kevorkian, Artist; Professor of Painting and Printmaking, Virginia Commonwealth University: 1978.
George L. Kline, Milton C. Nahm Professor Emeritus of Philosophy, Bryn Mawr College: 1978.
Annette Kolodny, Professor of Comparative Cultural and Literary Studies, University of Arizona: 1978.
Richard W. Kotuk, deceased. Film: 1978.
Donald J. Kouri, Distinguished University Professor of Chemistry and Physics, University of Houston: 1978.
David Krause, Professor Emeritus of English, Brown University: 1978.
Sige-Yuki Kuroda, deceased. Linguistics: 1978.
Don Q. Lamb, Professor of Astronomy and Astrophysics, University of Chicago: 1978.
Ronald W. Langacker, Professor of Linguistics, University of California, San Diego: 1978.
Richard G. Lawton, Professor of Chemistry, University of Michigan: 1978.
Wonyong Lee, Professor of Physics, Columbia University: 1978.
Lynn Hollen Lees, Professor of History, University of Pennsylvania: 1978.
Richard D. Lehan, Professor Emeritus of English, American, and Comparative Literature, University of California, Los Angeles: 1978.
Herbert Lehnert, Research Professor of German, University of California, Irvine: 1978.
Richard L. Levin, Emeritus Professor of English, State University of New York at Stony Brook: 1978.
Robert I. Levy, Emeritus Professor of Anthropology, University of California, San Diego: 1978.
Benjamin M. Lifson, Photographer, New York City: 1978.
J. G. Liou, Professor of Geology, Stanford University: 1978.
Trevor Lloyd, Professor of History, University of Toronto: 1978.
Clara M. Lovett, President, Northern Arizona University, Flagstaff, Arizona: 1978.
J. Anthony Lukas, Deceased. General Nonfiction: 1978.
Roderick Macneil, John Henry Wigmore Professor of Law, Northwestern University: 1978.
Peter B. Maggs, Peter and Sarah Pedersen Professor of Law, University of Illinois at Urbana-Champaign: 1978.
John Margolies, Architectural Critic, New York City: 1978.
Lynn Margulis, Distinguished University Professor, University of Massachusetts, Amherst: 1978.
Sherwin A. Maslowe, Professor of Mathematics, McGill University: 1978.
Jeffrey P. Mass, Professor of History, Stanford University; Professor of Japanese, Oxford University: 1978.
James A. Matisoff, Professor of Linguistics, University of California, Berkeley: 1978.
William F. May, Cary M. Maguire Professor of Ethics, Southern Methodist University: 1978.
David R. Mayhew, Sterling Professor of Political Science, Yale University: 1978.
William McAllister-Johnson, Professor of the History of Art, University of Toronto: 1978.
Michael McCanles, Professor of English, Marquette University: 1978.
Gerald W. McFarland, Professor of History, University of Massachusetts Amherst: 1978.
Leonard Melfi, Playwright, New York City: 1978.
Jeffrey Meyers, Writer; Kensington, California: 1978.
Brenda Miller, Artist, New York City: 1978.
Roy A. Miller, Professor Emeritus of Asian Languages and Literature, University of Washington: 1978.
Richard Misrach, Photographer, Emeryville, California: 1978.
Phillip M. Mitchell, deceased. German and Scandinavian Literature: 1978.
John Modell, Professor of Education and Human Development and Professor of Sociology, Brown University: 1978.
John N. Morris, Deceased. Poetry: 1978.
James D. Muhly, Emeritus Professor of Ancient Near Eastern History, University of Pennsylvania: 1978.
Bharati Mukherjee, Writer; Professor of English, University of California, Berekeley: 1978.
Donald J. Munro, Emeritus Professor of Philosophy and of Chinese, University of Michigan: 1978.
Conlon Nancarrow, Deceased. Music Composition: 1978.
Barbara Nolan, chair, Professor of English, University of Virginia: 1978.
R. Glenn Northcutt, Professor of Neuroscience, University of California, San Diego: 1978.
Gananath Obeyesekere, Professor of Anthropology, Princeton University: 1978.
Darcy O'Brien, Deceased. Fiction: 1978.
David M. Olan, Composer; Professor of Music, Baruch College and The Graduate Center, City University of New York: 1978.
Wilma K. Olson, Mary I. Bunting Professor of Chemistry, Douglass College, Rutgers University: 1978.
Michael Oppenheimer, Chief Scientist, Environmental Defense Fund, New York City: 1978.
Elaine H. Pagels, Harrington Spear Paine Foundation Professor of Religion, Princeton University: 1978.
Orlando Patterson, John Cowles Professor of Sociology, Harvard University: 1978.
Robert A. Pendleton, Choreographer, Washington, Connecticut; artistic director, Momix Dance Theater: 1978.
Donald Phelps, Writer, New York City: 1978.
Edmund S. Phelps, McVickar Professor of Political Economy, Columbia University: 1978.
Eric R. Pianka, Professor of Zoology, University of Texas at Austin: 1978.
Claude Pichois, Distinguished Professor Emeritus of French, Vanderbilt University: 1978.
David B. Pisoni, Chancellors' Professor of Psychology and Cognitive Science, Indiana University: 1978.
David Premack, Professor Emeritus of Psychology, University of Pennsylvania: 1978.
Kenneth Price, Artist: 1978.
Dean G. Pruitt, Distinguished Professor of Psychology, State University of New York at Buffalo: 1978.
Paul H. Rabinowitz, Professor of Mathematics, University of Wisconsin–Madison: 1978.
Steve Reich, Composer, New York City: 1978.
Peter Hanns Reill, Associate Professor of History, University of California, Los Angeles: 1978.
Martin Rein, Professor of Sociology, Massachusetts Institute of Technology: 1978.
Howard Reiss, Emeritus Professor of Chemistry, University of California, Los Angeles: 1978.
Robert V. Remini, Historian, University of Illinois at Chicago: 1978.
Richard J. Roberts, Director of Research, New England Biolabs, Beverly, Massachusetts: 1978.
Walter Rosenblum, Photographer; Professor Emeritus of Art, Brooklyn College, City University of New York: 1978.
Charles L. Ross, Associate Professor of English, University of Hartford: 1978.
Michael Rothschild, Dean of Social Sciences and Professor of Economics, University of California, San Diego: 1978.
David G. Rubin, Emeritus Professor of Literature, Sarah Lawrence University; Visiting professor, Middle Eastern Languages and Cultures, Columbia University: 1978.
Joel Sachs, chairman, Music History, The Juilliard School: 1978.
Edward B. Saff, Professor of Mathematics, University of South Florida: 1978.
Daniel J. Sandin, Artist; Professor of Art, University of Illinois at Chicago: 1978.
Giovanni Sartori, Albert Schweitzer Professor in the Humanities, Columbia University: 1978.
Dennis Schmitz, Poet; Professor of English, California State University, Sacramento: 1978.
Millard Kent Schumaker, Professor of Religion, Queen's University, Kingston; Associate Professor of Religion and Ethics, Queen's Theological College: 1978.
Joseph Schwantner, Composer; Professor of Composition, Eastman School of Music, University of Rochester: 1978.
John H. Schwarz, Harold Brown Professor of Theoretical Physics, California Institute of Technology: 1978.
Dana S. Scott, Hillman University Professor of Computer Science and Mathematical Logic, Carnegie Mellon University: 1978.
James C. Scott, Eugene Meyers Professor of Political Science and Anthropology, Yale University: 1978.
Martin F. Semmelhack, Professor of Chemistry, Princeton University: 1978.
Wallace Shawn, Playwright, New York City: 1978.
Joel Sherzer, Liberal Arts Foundation Centennial Professor of Anthropology and Linguistics, University of Texas at Austin: 1978.
Harry Sieber, Professor of Romance Languages, Johns Hopkins University: 1978.
Elie Siegmeister, Deceased. Music Composition: 1978.
Michael Silverstein, Samuel N. Harper Professor of Anthropology, Linguistics, and Psychology, University of Chicago: 1978.
Melvin I. Simon, chair, Professor of Biological Sciences, California Institute of Technology: 1978.
Lawrence Sirovich, Professor; Director, Laboratory of Applied Mathematics, CUNY/Mt. Sinai, New York City: 1978.
William E. Spicer, Stanford W. Ascherman Professor of Engineering, Stanford University: 1978.
David E. Stannard, Associate Professor of American Studies, University of Hawaii at Manoa: 1978.
Ross M. Starr, Professor of Economics, University of California, San Diego: 1978.
John M. Steadman, III, Emeritus Professor of English, University of California Riverside, and Senior Research Associate, The Henry E. Huntington Library, San Marino: 1978.
Hilgard O'Reilly Sternberg, Professor Emeritus of Geography, University of California, Berkeley: 1978.
Joel Sternfeld, Photographer; Member of the Faculty, Sarah Lawrence College: 1978, 1982.
Garrett Stewart, Professor of English, University of California, Santa Barbara: 1978.
Alan A. Stone, Touroff-Glueck Professor of Law and Psychiatry, Harvard University: 1978.
Daniel W. Stroock, Professor of Mathematics, Massachusetts Institute of Technology: 1978.
Joel Sucher, Producer, Pacific Street Films, Brooklyn, New York: 1978.
Lawrence Anthony Sullivan, Earl Warren Professor of Public Law, University of California, Berkeley: 1978.
John Suppe, Blair Professor of Geology, Princeton University: 1978.
Elizabeth Swados, Composer and Theatre Director, New York City: 1978.
Kei Takei, Choreographer, New York City: 1978, 1988.
Robert E. Tarjan, James S. McDonnell Distinguished University Professor of Computer Science, Princeton University: 1978.
Mark C. Taylor, Cluett Professor of Humanities, Williams College: 1978.
J. Mills Thornton, III, Professor of History, University of Michigan: 1978.
Micheline L. Tison-Braun, Professor Emeritus of French, Hunter College and Graduate Center, City University of New York: 1978. Appointed as Braun, Micheline L.
Calvin Tomkins, Staff Writer, The New Yorker: 1978.
Paul Uselding, Dean, Professor of Management, University of Toledo, Toledo, OH: 1978.
Kermit Vanderbilt, Distinguished Professor of English, San Diego State University: 1978.
John Van Sickle, Professor of Classics, Brooklyn College, and Professor of Classics and of Comparative Literature, Graduate School, City University of New York: 1978.
David Vaughan, Dance Critic; Archivist, Cunningham Dance Foundation: 1978.
William Veeder, Professor of English and of the Humanities, University of Chicago: 1978.
Arthur F. Veinott, Professor of Operations Research, Stanford University: 1978.
Ellen Bryant Voigt, Poet, Marshfield, Vermont: 1978.
Stanko B. Vranich, Associate Professor of Romance Languages, Herbert H. Lehman College, City University of New York: 1978.
Robert V. Wagoner, Professor of Physics, Stanford University: 1978.
Anthony F. C. Wallace, University Professor Emeritus of Anthropology, University of Pennsylvania: 1978.
William S-Y. Wang, chair, Professor of Language Engineering, City University of Hong Kong: 1978.
J. P. Wearing, Emeritus Professor of English, University of Arizona: 1978.
James M. Wells, Curator Emeritus, The Newberry Library, Chicago: 1978.
, Professor of Art, University of California-Berkeley: 1978.
Thornton Willis, Artist, New York City: 1978.
Jacqueline Winsor, Artist; Instructor in Fine Arts, School of Visual Arts: 1978.
Joseph A. Wittreich, Jr., Distinguished Professor of English, City University of New York Graduate School and University Center: 1978.
Donald R. Yennie, Deceased. Physics: 1978.
David Young, Poet; Longman Professor of English, Oberlin College: 1978.
Robert B. Zajonc, Professor of Psychology, Stanford University: 1978.

Latin American and Caribbean Fellows 

Carlos Aragone Salveraglio, Professor of Physics, Simon Bolivar University, Caracas: 1978.
Winston Branch, Artist, St. Lucia, West Indies; Adjunct Professor of Art, University of California, Berkeley: 1978.
Daniel Pedro Cardinali, Head, Division of Neuroendocrine Pharmacology, Center for Pharmacological Research, National Research Council of Argentina, Buenos Aires: 1978.
Antonio Cisneros Campoy, Writer; Professor of Literature, National University of San Marcos, Lima: 1978.
Alfredo Elio Cocucci, Professor of Botany, National University of Córdoba: 1978.
Asdrubal Colmenarez, Artist; Research Associate In Art, University of Paris VIII, France: 1978.
Manuel Dannemann, Professor of Ethnology and Folklore, University of Chile: 1978.
Jorge Eduardo Eielson, Writer, Milan, Italy: 1978.
Gustavo Eduardo Ferrari, Deceased. Political Science: 1978.
Guillermo Carlos Flichman, Research Economist, International Center for Advanced Mediterranean Agronomic Studies, Paris: 1978.
Fernando Gagliuffi Kolich, Film Maker and Architect, Lima: 1978.
Norbel Galanti, Professor of Cell Biology and Genetics, University of Chile School of Medicine: 1978.
Rubens Gerchman, Artist; Director, School of Visual Arts, Rio de Janeiro: 1978.
Carlos Roberto González, Professor, Institute of Geology, Miguel Lillo Foundation; Professor of Historical Geology, National University of Tucumán : 1978.
Luis Jorge González Fernández. Deceased. Emeritus Professor of Music Theory and Composition, University of Colorado Boulder: 1978
David Huerta Bravo, Writer, México, D.F.: 1978.
Enrique Krauze Kleinbort, Research Associate in History, College of Mexico, Mexico, D.F.: 1978.
Larissa A. Lomnitz, Professor of Anthropology, National Autonomous University of Mexico, Mexico, D.F.: 1978.
Carlos José Pereira de Lucena, Professor of Computer Science, Pontifical Catholic University of Rio de Janeiro: 1978.
Gerardo Martínez-López, Plant Virologist, Colombian Agricultural and Livestock Institute, Bogotá: 1978.
Elisa T. Marusic, Professor of Medicine, University of Los Andes: 1978.
Humberto R. Maturana, Professor of Biology, University of Chile: 1978.
Shivadhar Srinivasa Naipaul, Deceased. Fiction: 1978.
Antonio Paes de Carvalho, President, BIO-RIO; Professor of Biophysics and Physiology, Federal University of Rio de Janeiro: 1978.
Rafael Panzone, Retired Professor of Mathematics, National University of the South, Bahí a Blanca; Career Scientist, National Research Council of Argentine: 1978.
Leôncio Martins Rodrigues, Professor of Social Science, University of São Paulo: 1978.
Andrea Tonacci, Film Maker, São Paulo: 1978, 1982.
Marco Antonio Valdivia, Photographer, Antofagasta, Chile: 1978.

See also
Guggenheim Fellowship

References

1978
1978 awards